Musanga is a genus of flowering plants belonging to the family Urticaceae.

Its native range is Tropical Africa.

Species
Species:

Musanga cecropioides 
Musanga leo-errerae

References

Urticaceae
Urticaceae genera